Sveti Boštjan is a small village on the right bank of the Drava River in the Municipality of Dravograd in the Carinthia region in northern Slovenia.

The local church, from which the settlement gets its name, is dedicated to Saint Sebastian and Saint Roch. The originally Late Gothic church was extended in the 16th and 17th centuries.
It belongs to the Parish of Dravograd.

References

External links
Sveti Boštjan on Geopedia

Populated places in the Municipality of Dravograd